Oenochroma subustaria, also known as the grey wine moth, is a species of moth of the  family Geometridae. It is found in Australia, including Tasmania.

References

Oenochrominae
Moths of Australia
Moths described in 1860
Taxonomy (biology)